Allie & Me is a 1997 comedy film directed by Michael Rymer and starring Lyndie Benson. It won an award at the 1997 RiverRun International Film Festival.

Cast
Lyndie Benson as Michelle Halaburton
Joanne Baron as Allie Dadadad
James Wilder as Rodney Alexander 
Steven Chester Prince as Detective Simon Burke
Ed Lauter as Detective Frank Richards
Harry Hamlin as Dustin Halaburton 
Lainie Kazan as Camille Alexander  
Julianne Phillips as Angela Nansky 
Dyan Cannon as Christine Brown

References

External links

1997 films
Films directed by Michael Rymer
1997 comedy films
American comedy films
1990s English-language films
1990s American films